The 2010 World Indoor Bowls Championships was held at Potters Leisure Resort, Hopton on Sea, Great Yarmouth, England, from 05 to 24 January 2010.

Winners

Draw and results

Men's singles

Finals

Top half

Bottom half

Men's Pairs

Women's singles

Mixed Pairs

References

External links
Official website

2010 in bowls
World Indoor Bowls Championship